The 1990–91 season of the Venezuelan Primera División, the top category of Venezuelan football, was played by 16 teams. The national champions were Universidad de Los Andes.

Results

Standings

External links
Venezuela 1991 season at RSSSF

Venezuelan Primera División seasons
Ven
Ven
1990–91 in Venezuelan football